Merenskyite is a rare telluride / bismuthinide mineral with the chemical formula . It is an opaque white to light gray metallic mineral that occurs as inclusions within other minerals such as chalcopyrite. It crystallizes in the trigonal crystal system.

Merenskyite was first described in 1966 for an occurrence in the Merensky Reef of the Western Bushveld Igneous Complex, South Africa, and named for South African geologist Hans Merensky (1871–1952).

References

Telluride minerals
Bismuthide minerals
Palladium minerals
Platinum minerals
Trigonal minerals
Minerals in space group 164
Minerals described in 1966